Pomeroy "Doc" Cannon (born Harry Roy Cannon) was an American actor who worked in Hollywood during the silent era. He was known for playing villains and tough guys.

Biography 
Pomeroy was born in New Albany, Indiana, to Greenbury Cannon and Mary Austin. He worked as a doctor before becoming an actor in Los Angeles, and was thus nicknamed Doc.

Partial filmography

 The Good Bad-Man (1916)
 The Parson of Panamint (1916)
 The Microscope Mystery (1916)
 Pidgin Island (1916)
 The Honor System (1917)
 The Circus of Life (1917)
 The Legion of Death (1918)
 Restitution (1918)
 Denny from Ireland (1918)
 A Man of Honor (1919)
 The Thunderbolt (1919)
 The Slim Princess (1920)
 The Star Rover (1920)
 The Four Horsemen of the Apocalypse (1921)
 The White Mouse (1921)
 The Rosary (1922)
 Golden Dreams (1922)
 Trifling Women (1922)

References

External links

American male film actors
American male silent film actors
20th-century American male actors
Male actors from Indiana
1870 births
1928 deaths
People from New Albany, Indiana